Asura melanoxantha is a moth of the family Erebidae. It is found in New Guinea.

References

melanoxantha
Moths described in 1914
Moths of New Guinea